Salvia occidentalis, the West Indian sage, is a small annual herb native to the Caribbean, Mexico, and South America

The herb typically growing in damp bushy areas between  elevation.

Notes

External links
USDA Plants Profile

occidentalis
Flora of Mexico
Flora of South America
Plants described in 1788
Taxa named by Olof Swartz